San Uk Tsai, also called Tam Chuk Hang San Uk Tsai, is a Hakka walled village in Fanling, North District, New Territories, Hong Kong.

Administration
San Uk Tsai is a recognized village under the New Territories Small House Policy.

History
San Uk Tsai was probably established before 1688.

See also
 Walled villages of Hong Kong

References

External links

 Delineation of area of existing village San Uk Tsai (Fanling) for election of resident representative (2019 to 2022)
 

Walled villages of Hong Kong
Fanling
Villages in North District, Hong Kong